Foster may refer to:

People
 Foster (surname)
 Foster Brooks (1912–2001), American actor
 Foster Moreau (born 1997), American football player
 Foster Sarell (born 1998), American football player
 John Foster Dulles (1888–1959), American diplomat and politician
 Sterling Foster Black (1924–1996), American lawyer
 Jodie Foster (born 1962), American actor

Places
Australia
 Foster, Victoria

Canada
Foster, Quebec, a village, now part of the town of Broke Lake

United Kingdom
 Foster Mill, in Cambridge, England

United States
 Foster (CTA), elevated transit station in Evanston, Illinois, USA
 Foster, California (disambiguation)
 Foster, San Diego County, California
 Foster, Indiana
 Foster, Kentucky
 Foster, Washtenaw County, Michigan
 Foster, Minnesota
 Foster, Missouri
 Foster, Nebraska
 Foster, Oklahoma
 Foster, Oregon
 Foster, Rhode Island
 Foster Township, Michigan
 Foster, Wisconsin (disambiguation)
 Foster, Clark County, Wisconsin, a town
 Foster, Eau Claire County, Wisconsin, an unincorporated community
 Foster City, California
 Foster Township (disambiguation)

Child care
 Foster care, the modern system of placing children in state custody in the homes of temporary caregivers
 Fosterage, the sometimes historical practice of children being raised by families not their own

Arts, entertainment, and media

Fictional characters
 Foster, a dog on General Hospital from 1994 to 1998
 Foster, one of The Fuzzpaws, puppets on the Canadian channel YTV
 Court Foster, a character in the film The Man in the Moon (1991)
Madame Foster and Francis "Frankie" Foster, recurring characters of the animated show Foster's Home for Imaginary Friends. The latter being the former's granddaughter

Literature
 "Foster" (short story), by Claire Keegan, 2010
 Ellen Foster, 1987 novel by American author Kaye Gibbons

Other art, entertainment, and media
 Foster (film), a 2011 British comedy-drama film written and directed by Jonathan Newman

 Foster the People, an American rock band named after its lead singer Mark Foster
 Foster's Home for Imaginary Friends, animated television series

Brands and companies
 Foster and Partners, an architectural firm
 Foster, Rastrick and Company, British steam locomotive manufacturer
 Foster's Group, Australian beer producer
 Foster's Lager
 William Foster & Co., British agricultural machinery company

Science and technology
 Foster's reactance theorem, theorem in electrical engineering
 Foster's rule (island rule), principle in evolutionary biology
 Foster's theorem, theorem in probability theory
 Foster, a 6-row malting barley variety
 Foster (crater), a small lunar impact crater on the far side of the Moon

See also
Foster Island (disambiguation)
Fosters (disambiguation)
Forster (disambiguation)
Justice Foster (disambiguation)